The 16th Central American and Caribbean Junior Championships were held in the Estadio Rafael Hernández Ochoa in Coatzacoalcos, Veracruz, Mexico, between 25–27 June 2004.  The games were originally planned to be held in San Salvador, El Salvador. However, they were relocated to the state of Veracruz in Mexico in early 2004.  Both cities of Xalapa and Coatzacoalcos were applicants.  A discussion of the results is given.

Records
A couple of new championship records were set.

Key

Notes:

1): A new (junior implement) hammer of 6 kg was used for the first time at the championships.  Therefore, the mark of 59.03m is naturally a new championship record.  However, Yosmel Montes from Cuba threw the hammer 65.88m using the (senior implement) 7.257 kg hammer during the 1996 championships.

2): The result of 14.91s in 110m hurdles was reported as wind-assisted (2.7 m/s).

Moreover, there were a couple of further results marked as championship records. However, they might be disputable as discussed below:

Key

Notes:

3): Citlalli Huerta from Mexico jumped 3.70m during the 2002 championships (marked as "Exhibition").

4): Violeta Guzmán of Mexico threw the hammer (4 kg as in this competition) 51.46m during the 1996 championships.  The event was not held during the last championships in 2002, which might explain the mismatch.

5): Erik Corral of Mexico jumped 4.20m during the 1998 championships.  Again, the event was not held during the last championships in 2002, which might explain the mismatch.

Medal summary

The results are published.

Male Junior A (under 20)

Female Junior A (under 20)

Male Junior B (under 17)

Female Junior B (under 17)

Medal table

The placing table and medal count was published.

Total

Placing table

The placing table for team trophy
distributed to the 1st place overall team (men and women
categories) was published.

Overall

Participation (unofficial)

Detailed result lists can be found on the World Junior Athletics History website.  An unofficial count yields a number of about 411 athletes (223 junior (under-20) and 188 youth (under-17)) from about 21 countries:

 (1)
 (3)
 (2)
 (27)
 (10)
 (2)
 (18)
 (4)
 (12)
 (27)
 (13)
 (18)
 (7)
 (44)
 México (137)
 (3)
 (48)
 (5)
 (2)
 (3)
 (25)

References

External links
Official CACAC Website
CACAC Championships Website
Local Championships Website

Central American and Caribbean Junior Championships in Athletics
International athletics competitions hosted by Mexico
2004 in Mexican sports
Central American and Caribbean Junior Championships
2004 in youth sport